The common yabby (Cherax destructor) is an Australian freshwater crustacean in the Parastacidae family. It is listed as a vulnerable species of crayfish by the International Union for Conservation of Nature (IUCN), though wild yabby populations remain strong, and have expanded into new habitats created by reservoirs and farm dams.

Other names frequently used for Cherax destructor include the blue yabby or cyan yabby. Its common name of "yabby" is also applied to many other Australian Cherax species of crustacean (as well as to marine ghost shrimp of the infraorder Thalassinidea).

Colour is highly variable and depends on water clarity and habitat; yabbies can range from black, blue-black, or dark brown in clear waters to light brown, green-brown, or beige in turbid waters. Yabbies specifically bred to be a vibrant blue colour are now popular in the aquarium trade in Australia.

During a wet season, an Australian yabby can travel kilometres across land in search of new water in which to make its home.

The word "yabby" comes from Wemba Wemba, an Aboriginal Australian language.

Dissemination
Yabbys are common in Victoria and New South Wales, although the species also occurs in southern Queensland, South Australia, throughout parts of the Northern Territory and even as low as Tasmania, making it the most widespread Australian crayfish. It has been introduced to Western Australia, where it is an invasive species and poses a threat to other Cherax crayfish species native to the region, such as gilgies (Cherax quinquecarinatus).

Yabbys are found in swamps, streams, rivers, reservoirs, and farm dams at low to medium elevations. Yabbys apparently were largely restricted to lower-altitude habitats in inland areas of south-eastern Australia including the Murray-Darling Basin before European settlement, with the Euastacus spiny crayfish species found in higher-altitude habitats and the coastal river systems. High-altitude yabby populations in Lakes Eucumbene and Jindabyne, on the upper reaches of the coastal Snowy River system, are unusual and may be translocated.

Yabbys are found in many ephemeral waterways, and can survive dry conditions for several years by lying dormant in burrows sunk deep into muddy creek and swamp beds. 

Yabbys are primarily nocturnal detritivores, feeding primarily on algae and plant remains at night, but also opportunistically feeding on any fish or animal remains they encounter at any time of day.

In Southern Australia, it is commonly accepted that yabbys are active and thereby available to catch during the warmer months. (Colloquially, any month with the letter "R" in it.) When temperatures fall below , they enter a state of reduced metabolic activity, or "partial hibernation".

Yabbys are an important dietary item for Australian native freshwater fish such as Murray cod and golden perch.

Catching
Catching yabbies, or "yabbying", in rivers and farm dams is a popular summertime activity in Australia, particularly with children. The most popular method involves tying a piece of meat to a few metres of string or fishing line, which in turn is fastened to a stick in the bank, and throwing the meat into the water. The string is pulled tight when a determined yabby grasps the meat in its claws and tries to make off with it. The line is then slowly pulled back to the bank, with the grasping yabby usually maintaining its hold on the meat. When the meat and the grasping yabby reaches the water's edge, a net is used to quickly scoop up both the meat and the grasping yabby in one movement.

Other methods of catching yabbies involve various types of nets and traps. Local fishing regulations must be checked before using any nets and traps for yabbies; many types of nets and traps are banned, as wildlife such as platypus, water rats, and long-necked turtles can become trapped in them and drown.

Aquaculture

The common yabby is a popular species for aquaculture, although their burrowing can destroy dams.

Yabbies can also be found in private property dams where permission to fish must first be obtained. Bag limits apply to yabbies in most states. For example, in South Australia it is illegal to catch over 200 yabbies a day. All females carrying eggs under their tails must be returned to the water.

Yabbies as food

While less common than prawns and other crustaceans, yabbies are eaten in Australia much like crayfish in other countries. Usually, yabbies are boiled and eaten plain, or with condiments. They are also occasionally served at restaurants, where they may be prepared in salads, ravioli, pasta, etc. Prior to cooking, it is advisable to 'purge' the yabby in clean salt water, this helps to clear the gut of any muddy flavour, resulting in sweeter tasting meat.

In New South Wales, yabbies can be sold live at some fish markets such as Sydney Fish Market. In Victoria, whole yabbies can be purchased cooked and ready to eat at Queen Victoria Market.

References

Crustaceans described in 1936
Freshwater crustaceans of Australia
Parastacidae
Vulnerable fauna of Australia
Edible crustaceans